

This is a list of the National Register of Historic Places listings in Staunton, Virginia.

This is intended to be a complete list of the properties and districts on the National Register of Historic Places in the independent city of Staunton, Virginia, United States.  The locations of National Register properties and districts for which the latitude and longitude coordinates are included below, may be seen in an online map.

There are 35 properties and districts listed on the National Register in the city, including 1 National Historic Landmark.

Current listings

|}

See also

List of National Historic Landmarks in Virginia
National Register of Historic Places listings in Virginia
National Register of Historic Places listings in Augusta County, Virginia

References

 
Staunton